All India Poetry Prize was instituted by Poetry Society of India in 1988. The prizes are awarded to the best single work of poetry submitted by an Indian poet. The number of prizes varies from year to year.

Selection 
Selection of prize winners is through open competitions, variously known as All India Poetry Competition or National Poetry Competition. The process is similar to National Poetry Competition of U.K. However, only Indian citizens are eligible to participate without any age limit. Entry for the competition can be original poems written in English, or poems translated into English from any of the recognised Indian languages. A panel of judges consisting of eminent poets from India and abroad evaluate the poems without knowing the identity of the participating poets.

The Jury 
The jury selecting the prize winners consist of eminent poets from India and abroad. Past jury members include Peter Forbes, Lawrence Sail, Ruth Padel, Sitakant Mahapatra, J. P. Das, Keshav Malik, Anna Sujatha Mathai and Nissim Ezekiel among others.

Sponsorship  
Till 2000, the awards were sponsored by the British Council. Since 2013, the awards are being co-sponsored by the Government of India under the aegis of Ministry of Human Resources. There were no awards between 2000 and 2013.

List of winners 
 1988 : Vijay Nambisan for the poem "Madras Central"
 1990 : Rukmini Bhaya Nair for the poem "Kali"
 1991 : Rajlukshmee Debee Bhattacharya for the poem "Punarnava"
 1993 : Shampa Sinha for "Siesta", and Tarun Cherian for "A Writer's Prayer"
 1994 : Anju Makhija for "A Farmer's Ghost", and Smita Agarwal for "Our Foster Nurse of Nature is Repose"
 1995 : Tabish Khair for "Birds of North Europe", and Gopi Kottoor for "The Coffin Maker"
 1997 : Ranjit Hoskote for "Portrait of a Lady", and Gopi Kottoor for "Digging"
 1998 : First Prize - K. Sri Lata for "In Santa Cruz, Diagnosed Home Sick", and Revathy Gopal for "Lines on Meeting a Cousin, Long Lost"
 2000 : Shahnaz Habib for "Of Hypocrisy and Cheekbones", and Revathy Gopal for "I Would Know You Anywhere"
 2013 : Mathew John for "Another Letter from Another Father to Another Son", Tapan Kumar Pradhan for "The Buddha Smiled".
 2014 : Probal Mazumdar for "Grand Mother", Vidya S. Panicker for "A Suitcase Too Small", and N Madani Syed for "A Song to Sing"
 2015 : (ENGLISH) :- First Prize (English) - Sukanya Shaji for "Pilgrimage", Debrup Bhattacharya for "Star's Demise", and K. Priyamvada for "Fireflies"; (HINDI) :- Parul Gupta for "भूकंप" (Bhukamp, Amit Bisht for "एक किसान का सुईसाइड नोट" (Ek Kisaan ka Suicide Note), Rajesh Ahuja for "मन मंथन" (Man Manthan)
 2016 : (ENGLISH) :- Yatiraj Ramanujam for the poem "A Sudden Voyage", Shrestha Ghosh for "A Dream", Maitri S Shah for "Violence of the Truth"; (HINDI) :- Gaurav J. Pathania for "प्लास्टिक"(Plastic), Neelam Saxena for "ख़ुशी" (Khushi) and Monika Kalana for "तुम्हारे लौट आने की ख़ुशी में" (Tumhare Laut Aane ki Khushi Mein'')
 2017 : Gopi Kottoor

See also 
 Sahitya Akademi Award
 National Poetry Competition

References 

 
Indian literary awards
Indian poetry
Poetry awards